Azhikodan Raghavan was a leader of the Communist Party of India (Marxist) (CPI(M)).

Personal life 
He was born on 1 July, 1919, in South Bazar, Kannur.

Political life 
In 1940, he was groomed into a true communist by comrades P. Krishna Pillai and N.C.Shekhar. He was chosen to be the secretary of the Kannur town branch committee in 1946. In June 1951, he was chosen to be the member of the Malabar Committee of the Communist party and re-elected to the post. By that time Azhikodan had left his mark in Kerala politics. He was the secretary of the co-ordination committee of the coalition ministry of 1967.

Death 
Com. Azhikodan died in 1972. 

It is believed that fake news spread in Thrissur that A. V. Aryan was murdered led to the murder of Azhikodan. There are also allegations raised by Nawab Rajendran that K. Karunakaran had a role in the murder.

He was cremated in the public graveyard of Payyambalam beach, Kannur district, Kerala, where a column has been erected in his memory.

See also
A K Gopalan
E K Nayanar
E. K. Imbichi Bava
List of assassinated Indian politicians

References

External links
Official website

1919 births
1972 deaths
Indian atheists
Malayali politicians
Politicians from Kannur
Assassinated Indian politicians
Communist Party of India (Marxist) politicians from Kerala

Political killings in Kerala
History of Kerala (1947–present)